Don Phillips (December 21, 1940 – November 25, 2021) was an American casting director and film producer. His name was mentioned at the 94th Academy Awards in the In Memoriam section. 

Phillips was married to make-up artist Dorothy J. Pearl who died in 2018.

References

External links 

1940 births
2021 deaths
American casting directors
American film producers